The following lists events that happened during 1976 in the Union of Soviet Socialist Republics.

Incumbents
 General Secretary of the Communist Party of the Soviet Union: Leonid Brezhnev
 Premier of the Soviet Union: Alexei Kosygin
 Chairman of the Russian SFSR: Mikhail Solomentsev

Events

January

February
 February 24 - 25th Congress of the Communist Party of the Soviet Union

March

April

May

June
 June 1 - The Philippine government opens relations with the Soviet Union.

July

September

October

November

December

Births
 9 August – Sergei Tyumentsev,  former Russian professional football player
 31 August – Alikhan Ramazanov, former Russian professional football player

Deaths
 11 January – Aleksey Sorokin, member of Soviet cosmonaut program (b. 1931)
 26 April – Andrei Grechko, Soviet general, Marshal of the Soviet Union and Minister of Defense (b. 1903)
 30 November – Ivan Yakubovsky, Marshal of the Soviet Union (b. 1912)

See also
1976 in fine arts of the Soviet Union
List of Soviet films of 1976

References

 
1970s in the Soviet Union
Soviet Union
Soviet Union
Soviet Union